Pontefract bus station serves the town of Pontefract, West Yorkshire, England. The bus station is owned and managed by West Yorkshire Metro.

The bus station is situated in Pontefract town centre and can be accessed from Horsefair and Northgate.

There are nine stands at the bus station and the main operators are Arriva Yorkshire, Stagecoach Yorkshire, Stringers and Ross Travel.

Services
Buses run from the bus station around the town of Pontefract and as far a field as Castleford, Leeds, Wakefield, Selby, Doncaster and Barnsley.

References

External links
 Metro's Pontefract Bus Station page

Bus stations in West Yorkshire
Pontefract